Countdown – Die Jagd beginnt ("Countdown – The Chase Begins") is a German television series. It is a remake of the Spanish television series Cuenta atrás. It aired on RTL from 2009 to 2011.

See also
List of German television series

References

External links

 

2009 German television series debuts
2011 German television series endings
German comedy-drama television series
German crime television series
2000s German police procedural television series
2010s German police procedural television series
German-language television shows
RTL (German TV channel) original programming
Non-Spanish television series based on Spanish television series